Edward Hughes Thomson  was a Michigan politician.

Early life
On June 15, 1810, Thomson was born in Kendal, Westmorland, England.  He became a lawyer and practiced out of Millard Fillmore's Buffalo law office.

Political life
He served as Lapeer County's and Genesee County's Prosecuting Attorney. Became a Michigan State Senator in 1848 for the  6th district then Genesee County 1st District Michigan Representative from 1859 to 1860.  He enlisted as a colonel in the Union Army during the Civil War.  He was elected as mayor of the City of Flint in 1877 serving a 1-year term.

Death
Thomson died on February 2, 1886, in Flint, Michigan and is buried in Glenwood Cemetery, Flint.

References

English emigrants to the United States
Michigan lawyers
Mayors of Flint, Michigan
Members of the Michigan House of Representatives
Michigan state senators
Burials at Glenwood Cemetery (Flint, Michigan)
1810 births
1886 deaths
19th-century American politicians
19th-century American lawyers